Men's 100m races for amputee athletes at the 2004 Summer Paralympics were held in the Athens Olympic Stadium from 21 to 25 September. Events were held in three disability classes.

T42

The T42 event consisted of a single race. It was won by Wojtek Czyz, representing .

Final Round
21 Sept. 2004, 17:10

T44

The T44 event consisted of 2 heats and a final. It was won by Marlon Shirley, representing .

1st Round

Heat 1
24 Sept. 2004, 10:55

Heat 2
24 Sept. 2004, 11:05

Final Round
25 Sept. 2004, 17:30

T46

The T46 event consisted of 2 heats and a final. It was won by Elliot Mujaji, representing .

1st Round

Heat 1
24 Sept. 2004, 10:35

Heat 2
24 Sept. 2004, 10:41

Final Round
25 Sept. 2004, 17:50

References

M